The Mediterranean islands of Malta and Gozo had been ruled by Phoenician, Byzantine and Roman aristocrats, before passing to various European monarchies and eventually a republican government. Foreign monarchical rule over Malta lasted a total of 874 years. The Crown of Malta was patriated from that of the British for the first time in 1964 with the achievement of independence and abolished in 1974 with the establishment of the Republic of Malta.

The history, languages and culture of Malta and Sicily share many key events, including occupation by the Fatimids and an invasion by Roger I of Sicily in 1091. The islands parted ways in a decisive and permanent manner in 1799, when Malta became a British Crown colony. British colonial rule over Malta lasted 165 years. For an additional 10 years, Malta retained the British monarch as its independent head of state. Malta adopted a republican constitution on 13 December 1974, ending the monarchy altogether, and joined the European Union on 1 May 2004.

Kingdom of Sicily and County of Malta

From the years 1090 and 1530, the Maltese Islands were a non-autonomous part of the Kingdom of Sicily and thus had the same sovereign. At this time the Nobility of Malta resided in or around Mdina. A strong cultural (and, to a lesser extent, political) connection to Sicily survived from 1530 to 1798 throughout the 268-year rule over Malta by the Knights Hospitaller.

In terms of the regional divisions of the islands, Malta Island was part the Valle di Mazzara province, Gozo was part of the Valle di Demona province and Comino was part of the Valle di Noto province.

Counts of Malta

Roger I of Sicily (1091–1101), conqueror of Malta
Simon of Sicily (1101–1105)
Roger II of Sicily (1105–1154)
William I of Sicily (1154–1166)
William II of Sicily (1166–1189)
Tancred of Sicily (1189–1190)
 Margaritus of Brindisi (1192–1197)
 Guglielmo Grasso (c.1197–1203)
 Enrico "Pescatore" (c.1203–1232)
 Nicoloso (c.1232–1266)
 Charles I of Naples (direct rule 1266–1282), usurper during the Sicilian vespers; with Nicoloso as claimant (1266–1281)
 Andreolo da Genova (1282–1300), with Roger de Flor as claimant (1285–1296)
 Roger of Lauria (1300–1305)
 Lukina de Malta and her husband Guglielmo Raimondo I (1305–1320)
 Guglielmo II (c.1320–1330)
 Alfonso Federigo d'Aragona (c.1330–1349)
 Pietro Federigo d'Aragona (c.1349–1350)
 Louis of Sicily (direct rule 1350–1355)
 Frederick the Simple (direct rule 1355–1360), with Niccolo Acciaioli as claimant (c.1357–1360)
 Guido Ventimiglia (c.1360–1362)
 Frederick the Simple (direct rule 1362–1366)
 Manfredo III Chiaramonte (c.1366–1370)
 Guglielmo III d'Aragona (c.1370–1377)
 Luigi Federigo d'Aragona (1377–1382)
 Manfredo III Chiaramonte (1382–1391)
 Elizabetta Peralta Chiaramonte (c.1391–1392)
 Guglielmo Raimondo III Moncada (c.1392–1393)
 Artale II Alagona (c.1393–1396)
 Guglielmo Raimondo III Moncada (c.1396–1397)
 Maria of Sicily (direct rule 1397–1401) with her husband Martin I of Sicily (direct rule by jure uxoris 1397–1409)
 Martin of Aragon (direct rule 1409–1410)
 Ferdinand I of Aragon (direct rule 1412–1416)
 Alfonso V of Aragon (direct rule 1416–1420)
 Antonio de Cardona (c.1420–1425)
 Gonsalvo Monroy (c.1426–1428),
 Alfonso V of Aragon (1428–1458)
 John II of Aragon (1458–1479)
 Ferdinand II of Aragon (1479–1516)
 Charles V, Holy Roman Emperor (1516–1530)

Knights Hospitaller (1530–1798) 

Although the Knights Hospitaller ruled Malta as sovereign princes, they held that privilege as a fiefdom, paying a tribute of the Maltese Falcon annually to the Viceroys of Sicily, payable on the feast of All Souls' Day.
 See: List of Grand Masters of the Knights Hospitaller

France 
 Occupied by French First Republic (1798–1800)

British Crown (1799–1964)

House of Hanover

|-
| George III1799–1820 ||  || 4 June 1738Norfolk Houseson of Frederick, Prince of Wales and Princess Augusta of Saxe-Gotha || Charlotte of Mecklenburg-StrelitzSt James's Palace8 September 176115 children || 29 January 1820Windsor Castleaged 81
|-
| George IV29 January1820–1830 ||  || 12 August 1762St James's Palaceson of George III and Charlotte of Mecklenburg-Strelitz || (2) Caroline of BrunswickSt James's Palace8 April 17951 daughter || 26 June 1830Windsoraged 67
|-
| William IV26 June1830–1837 ||  || 21 August 1765Buckingham Palaceson of George III and Charlotte of Mecklenburg-Strelitz || Adelaide of Saxe-MeiningenKew Palace13 July 18182 children || 20 June 1837Windsor Castleaged 71
|-
| Victoria20 June1837–1901 ||  || 24 May 1819Kensington Palacedaughter of Prince Edward Augustus, Duke of Kent and Strathearn and Princess Victoria of Saxe-Coburg-Saalfeld || Albert, Prince ConsortSt James's Palace10 February 18409 children || 22 January 1901Osbourne Houseaged 81
|}

House of Saxe-Coburg-Gotha 

| Edward VII22 January1901–1910 ||  || 9 November 1841Buckingham Palaceson of Victoria and Albert, Prince Consort || Alexandra of DenmarkWindsor Castle10 March 18636 children || 6 May 1910Buckingham Palaceaged 68
|}

House of Windsor 
The house name Windsor was adopted in 1917, during the First World War. It was changed from Saxe-Coburg-Gotha because of wartime anti-German sentiment. The heirs of Elizabeth II, by royal proclamation, will remain part of the House of Windsor (even though their legal surname is Mountbatten-Windsor).

| George V6 May1910–1936 ||  || 3 June 1865Marlborough Houseson of Edward VII and Alexandra of Denmark || Mary of Teck6 July 1893St James's Palace6 children || 20 January 1936Sandringham Houseaged 70
|-
| Edward VIII20 January –11 December 1936 ||  || 23 June 1894Richmondson of George V and Mary of Teck || Wallis, The Duchess of WindsorFrance3 June 1937no children || 28 May 1972Parisaged 77
|-
| George VI11 December1936–6 February1952 ||  || 14 December 1895Sandringham Houseson of George V and Mary of Teck || Elizabeth Bowes-LyonWestminster Abbey26 April 19232 children || 6 February 1952Sandringham Houseaged 56
|-
| Elizabeth II6 February1952–1964 ||  || 21 April 1926Mayfairdaughter of George VI and Elizabeth Bowes-Lyon || Prince Philip, Duke of EdinburghWestminster Abbey20 November 19474 children || 8 September 2022 Balmoral Castle 
aged 96
|}

Maltese Crown (1964–1974) 

| Elizabeth IIQueen of Malta (Reġina ta' Malta)1964–1974(Monarchy abolished on 13 December 1974) ||  || 21 April 1926Mayfairdaughter of George VI and Elizabeth Bowes-Lyon || Prince Philip, Duke of EdinburghWestminster Abbey20 November 19474 children || 8 September 2022 Balmoral Castle aged 96
|}

When Malta acquired independence from the United Kingdom on 21 September 1964, Elizabeth II became the head of state and Queen of Malta. On 13 December 1974, Malta became a republic, abolishing the monarchy and establishing the President of Malta as the nation's head of state.

References

Malta